Rear-Admiral Kenneth J. Summers  (born July 20, 1944) is a Canadian retired naval officer, best known for being the commander of the Canadian contingent of the Persian Gulf War coalition.

Early life and education
Summers was born July 20, 1944 and graduated from Royal Military College in Kingston in 1967 before serving as an officer both at sea and in several postings ashore. In 1989 he was promoted to Commodore and appointed Commander Canadian Fleet and Chief of Staff Operations in Halifax, the appointment he was holding when Iraq invaded Kuwait in August, 1990.

Career
Summers assumed command of the Canadian Naval Task Force that sailed from Halifax to the Persian Gulf, and upon arrival he was appointed Commander Canadian Forces Middle East, with headquarters in Bahrain. All Canadian naval, air and land forces in the Gulf came under his command during the implementation of Operation Friction, where Canadian naval and air units engaged in combat for the first time since the Korean War.

After the Persian Gulf War, Summers served in Maritime Forces Pacific Headquarters (MARPAC HQ) as Chief of Staff to Commander MARPAC 1991. He was promoted to Rear-Admiral and was appointed as a Commander Canadian Defence Liaison Staff Washington in 1992. He served in National Defence Headquarters, Ottawa as Chief of Personnel Planning and Resources Management 1994 and as Director General Maritime Development 1995. He was appointed Chief of Staff Operations, Supreme Allied Commander Atlantic in Norfolk VA USA from 1997 to 2000. He retired in 2000.

Awards and decorations
Summers's personal awards and decorations include the following:
105px

110px

110px

References

External links
Biography at The Rt. Hon. Sir Winston Spencer Churchill Society of British Columbia web page
Canada's 25 Most Renowned Military Leaders

Royal Canadian Navy officers
Canadian admirals
Military leaders of the Gulf War
Living people
1944 births
Canadian military personnel from Ontario
Royal Military College of Canada alumni